St. Maria in der Kupfergasse is a Baroque church in Cologne, western Germany, in the district of Innenstadt. The pilgrimage church is dedicated to St. Mary, the Black Madonna. It was completed in 1715 and measures 37.20 meters in length and 17.30 metres in width.

See also  
 List of Baroque architecture

Sources 
 Manfred Becker-Huberti, Günter A. Menne:  Kölner Kirchen, die Kirchen der katholischen und evangelischen Gemeinden in Köln. J. P. Bachem Verlag, Köln 2004, .
 Stephanie Habeth-Allhorn: 175 Jahre Cellitinnen zur hl. Maria in der Kupfergasse, eine sozial-karitative Ordensgemeinschaft im Herzen von Köln. J. P. Bachem Verlag, Köln 2003, .
 Hugo Rahtgens: Die Kunstdenkmäler der Stadt Köln. Im Auftrage des Provinzialverbandes der Rheinprovinz und mit Unterstützung der Stadt Köln. Herausgegeben von Paul Clemen. 2. Band, I. Abteilung. Düsseldorf, Verlag L. Schwann 1911.
 Adam Wrede: Neuer kölnischer Sprachschatz. 1. Band, Greven Verlag, Köln, 9. Auflage 1984, S. 125, .
 Plenker, Werner: St. Maria in Der Kupfergasse Köln. Geschichte Und Beschreibund Der Kirche Und Gnadenkapelle St. Maria in Der Kupfergasse., Köln, 1975.

External links 

 Official website

Roman Catholic churches in Cologne
Baroque architecture in North Rhine-Westphalia
Roman Catholic churches completed in 1715
Innenstadt, Cologne
1715 establishments in the Holy Roman Empire
18th-century Roman Catholic church buildings in Germany